The MV Havila Harmony is a multi-role, dynamically-positioned support vessel built in 2005 for subsea construction and support operations. The vessel is owned by Havila Shipping and currently on long-term charter to Fugro.

History

The Havila Harmony was built by Havyard Leirvik and delivered in June 2005 to Havila Shipping. It was originally registered in Fosnavåg, Norway. In 2013, Fugro extended a long-term charter of the vessel, then operating in Malaysia, until 30 April 2017 with two optional one-year extensions.

The Havila Harmony was involved in the search for Malaysia Airlines Flight 370. Havila Harmony was outfitted with a Hugin 4500 autonomous underwater vehicle at the Australia Maritime Complex near Perth, Western Australia in November 2015. It arrived in the search area on 5 December 2015. The AUV aboard Havila Harmony was used to search the most challenging underwater terrain, which could not effectively be searched by the towed sonar used by other vessels in the search. On 2 January 2016, the AUV aboard Havila Harmony was used to investigate an anomalous, possibly-man-made seafloor feature; high-resolution sonar imagery from the AUV revealed the feature was a shipwreck, probably an iron or steel vessel from the turn of the 19th century.

Specifications and equipment
The Havila Harmony is based on a Marin Teknikk MT6010 hull. It was built in 2005 and configured to its current configuration in 2007. The vessel was designed for subsea construction operations and support of subsea operations.

The Havila Harmony has  of deck space and is equipped with an offshore crane, which can lift a maximum 100 tons (single fall) or 150 tons (double block). A helicopter deck above the bow is capable of operating a Eurocopter AS332 Super Puma or similarly-sized helicopter. Additionally, the vessel is outfitted with two Remotely operated underwater vehicles (ROVs), which are rated to  maximum operating depth. During the search for Malaysia Airlines Flight 370, it was equipped with a Hugin 4500 AUV.

References

External links
 

2005 ships
Ships built in Norway
Survey ships
Merchant ships of Norway
Merchant ships of Malaysia
Vessels involved in the search for Malaysia Airlines Flight 370